Anonymous types are a feature of C# 3.0, Visual Basic .NET 9.0, Oxygene, Scala and Go that allows data types to encapsulate a set of properties into a single object without having to first explicitly define a type. This is an important feature for the SQL-like LINQ feature that is integrated into C# and VB.net. Since anonymous types do not have a named type, they must be stored in variables declared using the var keyword, telling the C# compiler to use type inference for the variable.  The properties created are read-only in C#, however, they are read-write in VB.net.

This feature should not be confused with dynamic typing. While anonymous types allow programmers to define fields seemingly "on the fly," they are still static entities. Type checking is done at compile time, and attempting to access a nonexistent field will cause a compiler error. This gives programmers much of the convenience of a dynamic language, with the type safety of a statically typed language.

Examples

C#

var person = new { firstName = "John", lastName = "Smith" };
Console.WriteLine(person.lastName);
Output:

Go

var person struct { firstName string; lastName string }
person.firstName="John"
person.lastName="Smith"

OCaml

let person = object val firstName = "John" val lastName = "Smith" end;;

Oxygene

var person := new class(firstName := 'John', lastName := 'Smith');

PHP

$person = new class
{
    public $firstName = "John";
    public $lastName = "Smith";
};

Scala

val person = new { val firstName = "John"; val lastName = "Smith" }

Visual Basic .NET

Dim person = New With {.firstName = "John", .lastName = "Smith"}

See also
 Extension method
 Anonymous function
 Expression tree

References

External links
 C# 3.0 Language Enhancements Presentation
 Anonymous Types in Visual Basic 2008 - Learn about the new features in Visual Basic 2008.

C Sharp programming language family
Data types